As a province of South Africa, Mpumalanga is governed through a parliamentary system of government. From 1994 to the present, the African National Congress (ANC) has been the leading political party in Mpumalanga. Currently, the Economic Freedom Fighters (EFF), followed by the Democratic Alliance (DA) are the biggest opposition parties. The most recent elections were held with South Africa's general elections on 8 May 2019

Executive
Since 2018, Refilwe Mtsweni-Tsipane, a member of the African National Congress, has held the office of the premier of Mpumalanga.  The premier appoints ten members of the Mpumalanga Provincial Legislature to be on the Executive Council.

Mpumalanga Executive Council

Legislative
The legislative functions of the provincial government are carried out by the Mpumalanga Provincial Legislature, which elects the leader of the largest party or coalition in the legislature as the premier of the province.

See also 

 Mpumalanga (National Assembly of South Africa constituency)
 Premier of Mpumalanga
 Mpumalanga Provincial Legislature

References 

Mpumalanga
Mpumalanga